David Dawood (born 31 December 1981), known professionally as DaWood, is an English DJ/producer and songwriter. He is best known for producing and co-writing the song "Good Times" by Roll Deep, which was a number one on the UK Singles Chart for 3 weeks, making it the longest reigning number one of 2010.

Career
Since the early nineties, when Dawood began making beats on his school music computers, his main passion and priority has been creating music, leading to his decision to leave college in order to raise enough funds to buy studio equipment. 2001 brought Dawood his first cut; his track "Flexin" was used on the UK boy band Blue's album ‘One Love’ – the album selling over 2 million copies worldwide. Dawood has worked closely with Tinchy Stryder and on his 2012 album entitled ‘Full Tank‘, as well as having two cuts on the album, ‘Bad Intentions’ by Dappy.

2010-present
David Dawood is the musical architect behind 2010’s dance hit "Good Times" by Roll Deep featuring Jodie Connor. The single went to Number 1 in the UK Singles Chart and held this position for 3 weeks making it the longest reigning Number 1 of 2010.

In 2011, Dawood produced two singles for recording artist Jodie Connor; "Now or Never" which was released in January 2011 and charted at Number 14 on the UK Singles Chart and was soon followed by another UK Top 40, "Bring It" featuring Tinchy Stryder.

In 2012, Dawood produced the track "Take You There" by Jodie Connor featuring Busta Rhymes and it was released on 29 July 2012. Dawood has produced the track "Come with Me" by Dappy, which will feature on his debut studio album entitled Bad Intentions, and the track will be released worldwide on 12 August 2012. Other artists DaWood has worked with, written and produced for include Kelly Rowland, Wiley, Roll Deep, Jodie connor, Dappy, Tinchy Stryder, Maxta, Alex Hepburn, Little Nikki, Namie Amuro, Lawson, Cover Drive, Cheryl Cole, Zara Larsson, Vita Chambers, Christina Millian, Blue, Nathan Sykes, 99 Souls, Stylo G, Karen Harding, (FX), M-22, Bakermat, Alex Clare, Fluer East, Klingande

Discography

Songwriting and producing discography

Remixography

References

1981 births
Living people
Takeover Entertainment artists
Club DJs
English house musicians
English DJs
DJs from Manchester
People from Bury, Greater Manchester
Musicians from Greater Manchester
English record producers
Electronic dance music DJs